The 2020–21 season was Middlesbrough's fourth consecutive season in the Championship in their 145th year in existence, the club also competed in the FA Cup and EFL Cup.

Changes
As a result of the coronavirus pandemic, football in the 2019–20 season in multiple countries was halted in order to convey safety regulations, with football returning in England on 17 June for Premier League clubs and 20 June for Championship clubs; the decision was made for the premature conclusion of the League One and League Two seasons, with the final table would be calculated by a points-per-game method with the play-offs being played as normal. As a Championship club, Middlesbrough resumed play, their first game back in action in three months being a 3–0 defeat to Swansea City. With Middlesbrough already engaged in a surprising relegation battle, chairman Steve Gibson sacked club manager Jonathan Woodgate, which came as a surprise to supporters, with heavily experienced Neil Warnock, who had been linked with the club on numerous occasions, replacing him on the same day on a contract until the end of the season.

With the pandemic resulting in the delay of the season, the season's remaining matches continued past 30 June, the date which signifies the conclusion of an English football season as a whole, also including the date that sees players with expiring contracts being allowed to leave the club on a free transfer. This occurred heavily at Middlesbrough, with Rudy Gestede, Daniel Ayala, Mitchell Curry, Nathan Dale, Enes Mahmutovic, Layton Watts, Stephen Wearne, Harold Essien, Harry Flatters all departing. On the same day as the final game of the 2019–20 season, Adam Clayton announced his departure from the club through social media, with the club confirming this the following day.

First team squad

Statistics

|}

Goals record

Disciplinary record

Transfers

Transfers in

Loans in

Loans out

Britt Assombalonga free end of season

Transfers out

Pre-season friendlies

Competitions

Championship

League table

Results summary

Results by matchday

Matches
The 2020–21 season fixtures were released on 21 August.

FA Cup

The third round draw was made on 30 November, with Premier League and EFL Championship clubs all entering the competition.

EFL Cup

The first round draw was made on 18 August, live on Sky Sports, by Paul Merson. The draw for both the second and third round were confirmed on 6 September, live on Sky Sports by Phil Babb.

References

Middlesbrough F.C. seasons
Middlesbrough